The 2021 FIA World Cup for Cross-Country Rallies was the 29th and final season of the FIA World Cup for Cross-Country Rallies; an annual competition for rally raid events for cars, buggies, side-by-sides, and trucks held in multiple countries.

Calendar
The initial calendar for the 2021 world cup featured seven cross-country rally events.

Teams and drivers

Results

Overall

T3

T4

Championship standings

Points system
 Points for final positions are awarded as per the following table:

Drivers and teams must be registered with the FIA to score points.

FIA World Cup for Drivers, Co-Drivers, and Teams

Drivers' & Co-Drivers' championships

Teams championships

FIA T3 World Cup for Drivers

FIA T4 World Cup for Drivers and Teams

Drivers' championship

Teams championship

References

External links 
 

Cross Country Rally World Cup
World Cup for Cross-Country Rallies
Fédération Internationale de l'Automobile